In their -year history, the Chicago Bulls have selected the following players in the National Basketball Association draft.

Notes and references

 

Chicago Bulls draft picks
National Basketball Association draft
Draft History